Gilbert de Angulo was an Anglo-Norman knight, .

Biography
A son of Jocelyn de Angulo, 1st Baron of Navan, Gilbert held the barony of Machaire Gaileng (Morgallion and Ratoath). Upon his rebellion in 1195, all his lands were forfeited - given by Walter de Lacy to his brother, Hugh, about 1198 -  and Gilbert and his brothers Phillip and William outlawed.

Gilbert fled English jurisdiction and sought service with King Cathal Crobhdearg Ua Conchobair of Connacht. In return, Cathal granted him lands at Máenmaige, in western Uí Maine. Upon his pardon in 1206, King John of England confirmed him in lands granted by King Cathal and made him a grant of other lands. Brought back into John's favour, he assisted Cathal in the construction of Caeluisce, near Ballyshannon, in 1212. It was attacked and burned the following year, and Gilbert was killed during the attack.

Gilbert also appears to have held land in Uí Lomain and Cineal Fheicin/Muntir Mailfinnain. However, as all his lands were held by new owners subsequent to Richard Mor de Burgh's settlement of Connacht in the 1230s, it appears his family had by then died out in the male line.

Some of Gilbert's descendants altered the names from D'Angulo to Nangle, and the branch of the family which settled near Mallow, County Cork, further changed the name to Nagle. The surname "Costello" is derived from Gilbert's second son, Hostilo. As such, descendants of Costello became "MacCostello".

Annalistic references

From the Annals of the Four Masters:

 1193 - "Inishcloghbran was plundered by the sons of Osdealv, and the sons of Conor Moinmoy."
 1194 - "Gilbert Mac Costello marched, with an army, to Assaroe, but was compelled to return without being able to gain any advantage by his expedition."
 1195 - "Cathal Crovderg O'Conor and Mac Costelloe, with some of the English and Irish of Meath, marched into Munster, and arrived at Imleach Iubhair (Emly) and Cashel. They burned four large castles and some small ones."
 1211 - "An army was led by the Connacians, at the summons of the English bishop and Gilbert Mac Costello, to Assaroe; and they erected a castle at Cael-uisge."
 1212 - "Gilbert Mac Costello was slain in the castle of Cael-uisge; and the castle itself was burned by O'Hegny."

Family tree

   Joycelyn de Angulo, fl. 1172.
   |
   |___
   |                     |                        |
   |                     |                        |
   Gilbert      Phillip     William/William Mac Coisdealbhaigh
                                                  |  
                                                  |
                                   Miles Bregach Mac Coisdealbhaigh
                                                  |
                                 _|__
                                 |                |                 |
                                 |                |                 |
                              Hugo, d. 1266?    Gilbert Mor      Phillip, fl. 1288.

Literary reference
The Song of Dermot and the Earl (composed early 13th century) mentions the de Angulo family, and casts doubt upon Gilbert's paternity. This is probably intended to insult Gilbert as a traitor to the King.

References
Knox, Hubert Thomas. The History of the County of Mayo to the Close of the Sixteenth Century. With illustrations and three maps. Originally published 1908, Hogges Figgies and Co. Dublin. Reprinted by De Burca rare books, 1982. .

External links
 http://www.ucc.ie/celt/published/T100005C/

Normans in Ireland
12th-century births
1213 deaths
Norman warriors
People from Pembrokeshire
People from County Meath
People from County Galway